Ballad (sometimes called Ballade) is a piece for piano solo composed in 1929 by John Ireland.

A performance takes about 10 minutes.

References 

Solo piano pieces by John Ireland
1929 compositions
Piano ballades